Francesca Fox (born 13 June 1992) is a competitor in rhythmic gymnastics. Born in Trowbridge, Wiltshire, England, Fox represented Great Britain in the team event at the 2012 London Olympics.

References

1992 births
Living people
British rhythmic gymnasts
Olympic gymnasts of Great Britain
Gymnasts at the 2012 Summer Olympics
People from Trowbridge
Gymnasts at the 2010 Commonwealth Games
Commonwealth Games medallists in gymnastics
Commonwealth Games bronze medallists for England
21st-century British women
Medallists at the 2010 Commonwealth Games